Thomasius is a surname, and may refer to:

 Jakob Thomasius (1622–1684), German philosopher 
 Christian Thomasius (1655–1728), German jurist and philosopher
 Gottfried Thomasius (1802–1875), German theologian